Heinz Ambühl (15 June 1905 – 18 September 1992) was a Swiss sports shooter. He competed in the 50 m pistol event at the 1948 Summer Olympics.

References

External links
 

1905 births
1992 deaths
Swiss male sport shooters
Olympic shooters of Switzerland
Shooters at the 1948 Summer Olympics